The Zolotonoshka is a small river in south-central Ukraine.  The Zolotonoshka is a left tributary of the Dnieper (Dnipro). The length of the river is 88 kilometers. The drainage basin is 1260 km2.

The name is derived from a legend that Ukrainian cossacks were hiding gold (from Ukrainian: золото (zoloto - gold) in the river. Scientists explain that the sand on the bottom of the river was shining in the sunlight, making people believe that there was gold. It is located near and chiefly serves the needs of the city of Zolotonosha. Since about 2011, the sewage from the city has been drained directly into the river without any processing, destroying the eco-system of the river.

References

Rivers of Cherkasy Oblast